Moises Lino e Silva is the author of Minoritarian Liberalism: A Travesti Life in a Brazilian Favela (University of Chicago Press 2022) and a professor of anthropological theory at the Federal University of Bahia, which is located in Brazil. His field of focus is that of political anthropology, with a specialty in the ethnographic study of liberty and authority. This is examined in relation to issues such as poverty, sexuality, race, and religion. His initial in-field research considered the aspects and issues of freedom as experienced and perceived by slum dwellers in Rio de Janeiro. 

In a public endorsement of Minoritarian Liberalism, political theorist Wendy Brown affirmed: "Lino e Silva's remarkable book fulfills its ambition to decolonize the freedom at liberalism's heart. Equal parts erudite political theory and delicate anthropology, it roams a favela in Rio for stories and imaginaries across Blackness, queerness, gender, and class, where it discovers everywhere the bubbling of minoritarian desires and practices of freedom. This beautifully written work does nothing less than bring liberalism--as theory and practice--into the twenty-first century."

The author's more recent work has studied the cultivation of Afro-Brazilian power and the nature of freedom and partial freedom after formal slavery, using ethnographic research to understand the current power dynamics between Latin America and West Africa.  He is also the editor, with Huon Wardle, of Freedom in Practice: Governance Autonomy and Liberty in the Everyday (Routledge 2017). Lino e Silva was appointed a World Social Science Fellow by the International Social Science Council.

References 

Year of birth missing (living people)
Living people
Brazilian anthropologists
Academic staff of the Federal University of Bahia